Bream may mean:

Fish
 Black bream (disambiguation), the common name of several species of fish
 Blicca bjoerkna (silver bream or white bream), a European species of freshwater fish in the carp family
 Bluegill, sometimes called 'bream'
 Bony bream (Nematalosa erebi), a widespread and common, small to medium-sized Australian freshwater fish
 Common bream (Abramis brama), a European species of freshwater fish in the carp family
 Emperor bream (Lethrinidae), a family of fishes in the order Perciformes commonly known as emperors, emperor breams, and pigface breams
 Gilt-head bream (Sparus aurata), called the Orata in antiquity and in Italy and Spain today, a fish of the bream family Sparidae found in the Mediterranean Sea and the eastern coastal regions of the North Atlantic Ocean
 Malawi bream (Chilotilapia rhoadesii), a freshwater fish in the cichlid family, which is endemic to Lake Malawi in East Africa 
 Red bream (disambiguation), several varieties of fish
 Sea bream, various species of marine fish in the family Sparidae
 Silver bream (disambiguation), the common name of several species of fish
 Threadfin bream (also known as whiptail bream and false snapper), a variety of species in the family Nemipteridae within the order Perciformes, found in tropical waters of the Indian and western Pacific Oceans
 Wuchang bream (Megalobrama amblycephala), a species of cyprinid fish native to the Yangtze basin, China

People
 Bream (surname)

Places
 Bream, Gloucestershire, a village in England
 Bream, West Virginia, an unincorporated community in the US
 Bream Bay, a locality and bay in New Zealand
 Bream Beach, a suburb of Shoalhaven, Australia
 Bream Creek, a rural locality in South-east Tasmania
 Bream Head, a promontory in New Zealand
 Bream Wood, a biological Site of Special Scientific Interest in Sussex, England

Ships
 Bream, an Australian gunboat: see Queensland Maritime Defence Force Auxiliary Gunboats
 , at least two ships of the Royal Navy
 , an American submarine

See also
 BREEAM (Building Research Establishment Environmental Assessment Method), a method of assessing the sustainability of buildings
 Brim  (disambiguation)